Amid (also Romanized as ‘Amīd and Āmīd; also known as Ḩamīd) is a village located in the Mangur-e Sharqi Rural District, Khalifan District, Mahabad County, West Azerbaijan Province, Iran. At the 2006 census, its population was 326, in 52 families.

References 

Populated places in Mahabad County